The Undisputed Truth is the third and final studio album by Seventh Star. It was released by Facedown Records on June 12, 2007.

Critical reception

Awarding the album three stars for AllMusic, Stewart Mason wrote, "[T]here's little here that will attract listeners who aren't already Christian-leaning metalcore fans." Peter John Willoughby, giving the album a seven out of ten at Cross Rhythms, wrote, "It's hardcore for the masses done by genuine guys we'll miss." Rating the album a seven out of ten from Indie Vision Music, Rand wrote that "they have cut a great album".

Track listing

References

2007 albums
Facedown Records albums
Seventh Star (band) albums